Piz Mitgel is a mountain in the Albula Range of the Alps, overlooking Savognin, in the canton of Graubünden. Similarly to its higher neighbor, Corn da Tinizong, it has an almost vertical south face. A via ferrata (Senda Ferrada) leads to the summit.

References

External links

 Piz Mitgel on Hikr
 Piz Mitgel on Summitpost

Mountains of the Alps
Alpine three-thousanders
Mountains of Switzerland
Mountains of Graubünden
Bergün Filisur
Surses